Pamela Nasiyo Kamugo (born on 23 May 1984) is a Ugandan social worker and legislator. As of April 2020, she has served as the elected woman member of parliament for Budaka district in the tenth Parliament of Uganda and eleventh Parliament of Uganda. She is affiliated with the National Resistance Movement, the ruling party of Uganda led by Yoweri Museveni, the country's president

Education 
Pamela Nasiyo started her primary education from Kamonkoli mixed primary school completing her primary leaving examinations (PLE) in 1996. She later enrolled at St. Johns Secondary School, Ntebetebe Kampala for her O'level and A'level education, completing her Uganda certificate of education (UCE) in 2000 and Uganda advanced certificate of education (UACE) in 2003. She later joined Uganda Christian University where she graduated with a bachelor's degree in social works and social administration (B.SWASA) in 2007.

Career 
Prior to joining elective politics, Kamugo was a social worker in Mbale district.

In 2016, she contested for and won the seat of woman member of parliament for Budaka district, replacing Sarah Kataike Ndoboli, a former minister of State for Luwero Triangle. In the tenth parliament, she serves as the chairperson of the Uganda Women Parliamentary Association (UWOPA). She is also a member of the committees on HIV/AIDS and related diseases as well as that of defense and internal affairs. and the committee on defence and internal affairs.

In 2017, she was arrested alongside three other legislators for "inciting residents to carry out a demonstration over the poor state of Mbale-Tirinyi-Kampala high way".

In 2019, she tabled a motion that resulted in the recalling of Uganda's Ambassador to Burundi over assaulting a female traffic officer.

As member of parliament, Pamela Nasiyo has been involved in demonstrations advocating for the well-being of common people, including a protest over the poor state of the Tirinyi road, which connects four districts in eastern Uganda. She also moved a motion in parliament to recall Major-General Matayo Kyaligonza from his posting as ambassador to Burundi for assaulting a female traffic officer on duty.

References

External links
Salem brotherhood Uganda limited, where Kamugo worked as a social worker

1984 births
Living people
Uganda Christian University alumni
Members of the Parliament of Uganda
Uganda Christian University
Women members of the Parliament of Uganda
National Resistance Movement politicians
21st-century Ugandan politicians
21st-century Ugandan women politicians